Vyšná Pisaná is a village and municipality in Svidník District of the Prešov Region of north-eastern Slovakia.

History
In historical records, this village was first mentioned in 1600.

Geography
It has a population of about 79 people.

References

External links
 
 

Villages and municipalities in Svidník District
Šariš